

50001–50100 

|-id=033
| 50033 Perelman ||  || Grigori Perelman (born 1966), Russian mathematician || 
|}

50101–50200 

|-bgcolor=#f2f2f2
| colspan=4 align=center | 
|}

50201–50300 

|-id=240
| 50240 Cortina ||  || Cortina d'Ampezzo, holiday resort in the Dolomites, Italy, host to the 1956 Winter Olympics, and near to the Col Drusciè Observatory || 
|-id=250
| 50250 Daveharrington ||  || David L. Harrington (born 1939) is a retired automobile engineer. || 
|-id=251
| 50251 Iorg ||  || Caroll Iorg (born 1946), a most enthusiastic amateur astronomer having been President of the Astronomical League (2010–2014) and currently serving as Media Officer. || 
|}

50301–50400 

|-bgcolor=#f2f2f2
| colspan=4 align=center | 
|}

50401–50500 

|-id=412
| 50412 Ewen ||  || Harry Ewen (born 1957), a Canadian amateur astronomer || 
|-id=413
| 50413 Petrginz ||  || Petr Ginz (1928–1944), Czech-Jewish boy who edited Vedem, a secret magazine, in the Terezín ghetto during World War II || 
|-id=428
| 50428 Alexanderdessler ||  || Alexander J. Dessler (born 1928) is a space physicist who shaped understanding of how charged particles interact with magnetic fields of Solar System objects. He first defined the existence and characteristics of the heliosphere, confirmed when Voyager 1 crossed the heliopause || 
|}

50501–50600 

|-bgcolor=#f2f2f2
| colspan=4 align=center | 
|}

50601–50700 

|-id=687
| 50687 Paultemple ||  || Paul Temple, pastor and amateur astronomer in Deming, New Mexico || 
|}

50701–50800 

|-id=717
| 50717 Jimfox ||  || Jim Fox (born 1945) started in astronomy in the 1950s with a "Junior Moon-Watch Team". He is the founder of what became the Minnesota Astronomical Society as well as a past President of the Astronomical League (1990–94). He was awarded the 2014 Leslie C. Peltier Award from the AAVSO. || 
|-id=718
| 50718 Timrobertson ||  || Tim Robertson (born 1956) is a Quality Engineer at NASA's Goddard Space Flight Center, with the GOES and JPSS weather satellite programs. On staff with the Association of Lunar and Planetary Observers (ALPO), he is Coordinator for the ALPO Training Program as well as Producer of the "Observer's Notebook" podcasts. || 
|-id=719
| 50719 Elizabethgriffin ||  || Elizabeth Griffin (born 1942) is a Canadian astronomer specializing in the spectroscopic study of binary stars. She has been a staunch advocate globally for the digitization and preservation of photographic plates and using legacy science data of all kinds. || 
|-id=721
| 50721 Waynebailey ||  || Wayne Bailey (born 1942) worked in the aerospace industry supporting the Space Shuttle Spacelab program. He became the Association of Lunar and Planetary Observers (ALPO) Lunar Coordinator in 2008 and in 2017 was the recipient of the ALPO Peggy Haas Service Award. || 
|-id=722
| 50722 Sherlin ||  || Jerry Sherlin (1944–2018) was a meteorologist for the U.S. Air Force specializing in space weather as a research assistant at Sacramento Peak Solar Observatory. He was also the 22nd President of the Astronomical League and very well known in astronomy, being a member of many professional and amateur organizations. || 
|-id=768
| 50768 Ianwessen ||  || Ian Remington Wessen (born 1992) has excelled as an honor student in high school, spent two summers learning the Russian language and six weeks working for the Europa Jupiter System Mission team || 
|}

50801–50900 

|-id=855
| 50855 Williamschultz ||  || William Schultz, Jr. (1904–1975) was with the Cranbrook school system in Bloomfield Hills, Michigan from 1930 to 1969. A man of many interests (astronomy, mineralogy, ham radio), he refurbished the Cranbrook (now Hulbert) Observatory. He built their first planetarium, becoming the first Resident Astronomer. || 
|-id=866
| 50866 Davidesprizzi ||  || Davide Sprizzi (born 2013), the son of the discoverer's daughter. || 
|}

50901–51000 

|-bgcolor=#f2f2f2
| colspan=4 align=center | 
|}

References 

050001-051000